László Orbán may refer to:

 László Orbán (boxer) (1949–2009), Hungarian boxer
 László Orbán (fencer) (1930–2018), Hungarian fencer and mathematician
 László Orbán (politician) (1912–1978), Hungarian politician
 László Orbán (sport shooter) (born 1960), Hungarian sports shooter